Perez or Pérez is a male given name which may refer to:

 Perez (son of Judah), son of Judah and Tamar from the Old Testament of the Bible
 Perez Ahabwe (born 1961), Ugandan economist and politician
 Perez ben Elijah (died 1295), French tosafist
 Perez Benjamin (1791–1850), farmer and politician in Nova Scotia (in present-day Canada)
 Perez Hilton (born 1978), alias of celebrity blogger Mario Lavandeira
 Perez Morton (1751–1837), American lawyer and revolutionary patriot, Massachusetts Attorney General and Speaker of the Massachusetts House of Representatives
 Pérez Prado (1916–1989), Cuban musician (original first name, Dámaso Pérez)
 Perez M. Stewart (1858–1924), New York politician
 Perez Zagorin (1920–2009), American historian and professor
 Pérez Gil, a Spanish soldier in a local legend who mysteriously transported from Manila in the Philippines to the Plaza Mayor (now the Zócalo) in Mexico City.

See also
 Paris (given name)
Pérez (disambiguation)
Pérez

Spanish masculine given names